igus is a German manufacturer and distributor of technical products made of high-performance plastics, including plastic plain bearings, flexible cables, energy chains, connectors, robotic components, 3D-printed products and ball bearings.

History 
Günter Blase established igus on 15 October 1964 in his double garage in Cologne, Germany. For the first 20 years the company worked as a supplier of complex technical polymer components. However, in 1983 Günter Blase's son, Frank Blase, established reinforced plastic cable-carrier systems and injection moulded polymer bearings as two distinct product groups and set up a network of sales engineers.

Between 1985 and 2018, igus has grown from 40 to around 3500 employees distributed between the head office in Germany and 38 subsidiary companies around the world. igus also has representative partners in more than 21 other countries.

igus uses the term triboplastics to describe its injection-molded polymers. They are tribologically optimized material compounds designed for low wear and long life and form the basis for all igus' products and systems.

igus UK 
igus UK opened in 1991 in Daventry, Northampton. In 2000, the office moved to Moulton Park, and in 2006 to Brackmills. The office was extended in 2017. The UK subsidiary stocks approximately 6 million parts, and has around 100 employees across the United Kingdom and Ireland.

igus UK has been certified for the ISO 9001:2015 Certificate of Approval, applicable to "supply and technical support for igus the-echain systems, chainflex cables and readychain, igus dry-tech and accessories".

South-east Asia 

igus Singapore Pte Ltd was established in 1997 and is the headquarters office for the south-east Asian market. The company has since launched local subsidiaries in Malaysia (2008), Thailand (2013), Indonesia (2013), Vietnam (2013) and the Philippines.

References

External links
 igus US website
 igus UK website

Manufacturing companies established in 1964
German brands
Wire and cable manufacturers
Manufacturing companies based in Cologne
Bearing manufacturers
1964 establishments in West Germany